450th may refer to:

450th Bombardment Group, an inactive United States Air Force unit formed in 1943 during World War II, inactivated in 1957.
450th Bombardment Wing, an inactive United States Air Force unit, activated 1963 and inactivated in 1968.
450th Expeditionary Flying Training Squadron (450 EFTS), a provisional United States Air Force unit assigned to the 322d Air Expeditionary Group
450th Intelligence Squadron (450 IS), an intelligence unit located at Ramstein AB, Germany

See also
450 (number)
450, the year 450 (CDL) of the Julian calendar
450 BC